The 2014–2015 Supreme Hockey League season was the 5th season of Supreme Hockey League. It began on September 8, 2014  in Karagandy with a match between the finalists of the previous season, Saryarka Karaganda and Rubin Tyumen with Saryarka winning the opening cup holder match. The winner of the regular championship ahead of schedule was also a club from Kazakhstan.

Clubs 
In the season 2014/15 the participants of the SHL left three teams: "the Crystal" (Saratov), "Lada" (Togliatti) and "Titan" (Klin). But the participants of the SHL joined team "Bars".

The team of "Navy-Karelia" (Kondopoga) was renamed to "SKA-Karelia".

Team's roster 
At any time in the main team may be no more than 27 players, regardless of playing position at the age of 17 years and older, 2 of them are hockey player at the age of 21 years.

Any SHL team have the right to include in the entry form of the team no more than 9 players of hockey club KHL  having with KHL team overall organizational and/or financial structure  and no more than 4 players for clubs who have signed with KHL team agreement on sports cooperation.

foreign players in one team must be no more than 4 field players . The foreign goalkeeper in Russian teams was prohibited. The foreign team must have not less than five players citizens of the state that represents this club in the SHL.

On any given match a team can have no more than 22 players: 20 players, including 2 goalkeepers and 2 field players aged 17–20 years.

Regular season

Format 
In 2014/2015 season SHL took part  24 teams. For the 1-st  teams play double-round tournament. Clubs are divided into six conditional fours on sporting and geographical basis, in which glean additional six matches (three games at "home" and "away"). Thus, in the first stage the teams will play 52 matches.

Standings

Player's stats

Defenders 
In the nomination "the Best defender in the SHL" by a vote of head coaches of clubs of the SHL defined contenders for the title of best players of the 2014/15 season. This table shows a summary of the regular season and the playoffs.

Forwards

Goalkeepers

Playoffs

External links 
 Official website 

Russian Major League seasons
SHL
SHL